The Kintampo rope squirrel (Funisciurus substriatus)  is a species of rodent in the family Sciuridae.
It is found in Benin, Burkina Faso, Ivory Coast, Ghana, Niger, and Togo.
Its natural habitat is moist savanna.

References

Funisciurus
Rodents of Africa
Mammals described in 1899
Taxonomy articles created by Polbot